Tisová a municipality and village in Ústí nad Orlicí District in the Pardubice Region of the Czech Republic. It has about 600 inhabitants.

Administrative parts
The village of Zaháj is an administrative part of Tisová.

References

Villages in Ústí nad Orlicí District